Tesler is a surname. Notable people with the surname include:

 Brian Tesler (born 1929), British television producer and executive
 Larry Tesler (1945–2020), American computer scientist

See also
 List of Tron characters#Tesler, fictional character
 Tesla (disambiguation)